Tournedos-sur-Seine is a small village and a former commune in the Eure department in Normandy in northern France. On 1 January 2018, it was merged into the new commune of Porte-de-Seine.

The village has approximately 25 houses, all of them situated in the banks of the river Seine.

The small town has a well known occurrence at sunset for the cliffs on the other side of the river to turn pink, and welcomes its own family of cormorants, swans and ducks, as well as other wildlife.

Population

See also
Communes of the Eure department

References

Former communes of Eure